Kantilal Ranchhodji Desai (27 January 1932 – 23 July 2016) was an Indian cricketer. He played nineteen first-class cricket matches for Gujarat between 1959 and 1966.

References

External links
 

1932 births
2016 deaths
Indian cricketers
Gujarat cricketers
Cricketers from Surat